The Mary River (Kabi Kabi: Moocooboola) is a major river system located in the South East and Wide Bay–Burnett regions of Queensland, Australia.

Etymology
The river was traditionally named Moocooboola by the indigenous Australian Kabi people. The river was named Wide Bay River on 10 May 1842 by early European explorers, Andrew Petrie and Henry Stuart Russell. The official name was changed on 8 September 1847 (prior to Queensland becoming a separate colony) by Charles Augustus FitzRoy, then Governor of New South Wales, to Mary River — after his wife Lady Mary Lennox (15 August 1790 to 7 December 1847).

History

The Mary River was used for rafting timber during the early years of European land settlement, and the discovery of gold at Gympie in 1867 brought an inflow of miners and pastoralists. Alluvial flats along the Mary River and some of its tributaries were used for cropping, and there was small-time dairying in the 1880s.

Course and features

The river rises at Booroobin in the Sunshine Coast hinterland, west of Landsborough. The Mary River flows into the Great Sandy Strait, near wetlands of international significance recognised by the International agreement of the Ramsar Convention and the UNESCO Fraser Island World Heritage Area, which attracts thousands of visitors every year.

Notable river crossings include the Dickabram Bridge, the Granville Bridge at Maryborough, and the Lamington Bridge.

From source to mouth, the Mary River is joined by nineteen tributaries, including the Tinana Creek, Munna Creek, Obi Obi Creek, Yabba Creek, Wide Bay Creek, Six Mile Creek, Deep Creek, and the Susan River. The river descends  over its  course.

While there are only two impoundments on the Mary River itself (the Gympie weir, and the barrage at Mungar, south of Tinana) there are a number of dams within the Mary River catchment on tributaries, Borumba Dam on Yabba Creek west of Imbil, Baroon Pocket Dam on Obi Obi Creek west of Montville, Six Mile Creek Dam on Six Mile Creek east of Cooroy, Cedar Pocket Dam on Deep Creek at Cedar Pocket, and two weirs (Talegalla and Teddington) and a barrage on Tinana Creek.

It is also a historical Australian river that contains gold as was first discovered in Gympie by James Nash.

2011 floods
The Mary River experienced major flooding during the 2010–2011 Queensland floods. In some places the river rose . The Bruce Highway was closed to the north and south of Gympie  and more than 50 homes and businesses were inundated. The high turbidity levels interfered with the natural breeding cycle for some of the river species.

Flora and fauna
The endangered Mary River turtle (Elusor macrurus) lives in the river. Other marine life native to the river include the Queensland lungfish (Neoceratodus forsteri) and the endangered Mary River cod (Maccullochella mariensis). Significant vulnerable and endangered species that live in the river also include endangered giant barred frog, Cascade tree frog and Coxen's fig parrot and the vulnerable tusked frog, honey blue-eye fish, the Richmond birdwing butterfly and the Illidge's ant blue butterfly. Saltwater crocodiles are occasionally seen in the lower reaches of the river, with one notable  crocodile being known to live in the river since April 2012.  Although the official range for saltwater crocodiles stops near Gladstone, it is widely regarded that the Mary River is the most southerly range limit for crocodiles.

Traveston Crossing Dam

In light of the region's longest drought in one hundred years, the Queensland Government announced on 27 April 2006 its intention to dam part of the Mary River at Traveston Crossing, south of Gympie.  The project was cancelled in November 2009, after being refused approval by Federal Environment Minister Peter Garrett.

The action had been planned to create a reservoir "almost as big as the Wivenhoe Dam" by 2011.  The Traveston Dam was projected to inundate an area of fertile farmland, endangered regional ecosystems and small towns more than 1.3 times the area of Sydney Harbour. There was considerable local opposition to the proposal, with all Mary Valley and Sunshine Coast Shire Councils opposed to the dam proposal on a variety of grounds including: the dislocation of the local community from the inundated area; adverse effects on downstream communities; and environmental impacts such as the removal of one of the few remaining habitats for the vulnerable Queensland Lungfish. More than 20,000 residents formally petitioned the Queensland State Parliament to halt the dam. There were further concerns that the geomechanics of the proposed site were not suitable for damming due to potentially significant leakage (due to the predominantly sandy substrate) and evaporation problems.

There was strong opposition to the dam from the wider and international community, based on environmental concerns related to the endangered Mary River cod, Mary River turtle, giant barred frog, Cascade tree frog, Coxen's fig parrot, the vulnerable Queensland lungfish, tusked frog, honey blue-eye fish, the Richmond birdwing butterfly and the Illidge's ant blue butterfly. There were also fears for the dugong, a globally vulnerable species. It was alleged that reduced fresh water flowing to the Great Sandy Strait would have affected the growth of seagrass, the dugong's primary food source.

The Mary River Turtle and the Queensland Lungfish attracted particular attention regarding their conservation. The Mary River Turtle, whose only known home is the Mary River, is a cloacal ventilator ('bum breather' – it uses oxygen from water taken in through its tail), and is listed in the top 25 most endangered turtle species in the world. The Lungfish also has great significance to evolutionary biologists. It requires the rapids in order to breed, and much of its breeding habitat had already been interrupted by other dams in Queensland. Professor Jean Joss of Macquarie University stated, in a submission to the Senate Inquiry 2007: "The Mary River dam would almost certainly push the lungfish to 'Critically Endangered,' and in the long term will lead to its extinction in the wild." The Mary River Cod, which only lives naturally in the Mary River system, is already Critically Endangered. It is completely protected, and it is illegal to fish them.

Port of Maryborough

The Port of Maryborough was opened in 1847 and in 1859 it was declared a port of entry. In 1856, after the river became unnavigable to larger vessels a new township and port were established.  From the 1850s to the end of the century the port was one of Australia's busiest immigration ports. Some authorities called the port "Wide Bay" well into the 1860s.

See also

References

External links

 Aerial video of the Mary River Valley and Kenilworth
 Mary River Catchment Coordinating Committee
 Help Save the Australian Lungfish

 
Floods in Queensland
Wide Bay–Burnett
Geography of Sunshine Coast, Queensland